Andrey Yevgenyevich Okladnikov (born 13 June 1999) is a Russian football player who plays for FC Yenisey Krasnoyarsk.

Club career
He made his debut in the Russian Football National League for FC Yenisey Krasnoyarsk on 9 October 2021 in a game against FC Rotor Volgograd.

References

External links
 
 Profile by Russian Football National League
 
 

1999 births
People from Kansk
Sportspeople from Krasnoyarsk Krai
Living people
Russian footballers
Association football forwards
FC Yenisey Krasnoyarsk players
Russian Second League players
Russian First League players